Script of the Bridge is the debut studio album by English rock band the Chameleons. It was released on 8 August 1983 by record label Statik.

Three singles were released from the album: "Up the Down Escalator", "As High as You Can Go" and "A Person Isn't Safe Anywhere These Days".

Content 
A sample of dialogue from the 1946 film Two Sisters from Boston was used as the introduction to the album's first track, "Don't Fall". According to the Chameleons' official website, "[the band] had a mic set up to a television and they recorded random bits, presumably for use in some songs".

Music and lyrics 
Andrew Welsh of Daily Record commented that the album is "characterised by subtly psychedelic Cure-like guitars and militaristic drum patterns reminiscent of Joy Division".

Promotion 
Three official singles and one promo single were released to promote the album. "Up the Down Escalator" was released as the album's first single in the UK, Germany and Spain on 1 January 1983 by the band's record label Statik. The band's US label, MCA Records, also issued it as a promotional single.

Statik issued "Don't Fall" as a promo-only single in France on 1 January 1983.

The album's second official UK single (also issued by Statik in Spain and Portugal) was "As High as You Can Go", released on 1 February. The third and final official single was "A Person Isn't Safe Anywhere These Days", released by Statik on 1 June in the UK and Portugal.

Release 
Script of the Bridge was released 8 August 1983 by record label Statik. The truncated US release on MCA Records, issued under the band name Chameleons U.K, omitted "Here Today", "Less Than Human", "Paper Tigers" and "View from a Hill".

The album was later released as a limited edition picture disc by Statik Records in 1985.

It was re-engineered and re-released in 2012 by Blue Apple Music.

Reception 

Upon its release, Sounds wrote in their review: it is a "powerful and rich album whose strength is an intense muscular beat".

In his retrospective review, Ned Raggett of AllMusic praised the album, writing, "Script remains a high-water mark of what can generally be called post-punk music; an hour's worth of one amazing song after another", calling it "practically a greatest-hits record on its own". Chris Jenkins, in the book The Rough Guide to Rock, called the album "such an impressive record that The Chameleons would struggle to emulate it".

Trouser Press was slightly less favourable, writing that it "isn't a great album", but "has very appealing moments".

Legacy 
Andrew Welsh of Daily Record wrote that "echoes of the Chameleons' distinctive sound can still be heard today in bands as diverse as the Killers (but without the penchant for angst), Editors and even Pigeon Detectives."

Track listing

Personnel 
 The Chameleons

 Mark Burgess – bass guitar, vocals, production
 Dave Fielding – guitar, production
 Reg Smithies – guitar, production, album cover artwork
 John Lever – drums, production

 Additional personnel

 Alistair Lewthwaite – keyboards

 Technical

 Colin Richardson – production, engineering

References

External links 
 

1983 debut albums
The Chameleons albums
Albums produced by Colin Richardson